Geoffrey Arthur Combes (19 May 1913 – 4 February 1997) was an Australian cricketer. Born in 1913 in Greymouth, New Zealand, he played nine first-class matches for Tasmania between 1932 and 1947.

See also
 List of Tasmanian representative cricketers

References

1913 births
1997 deaths
Australian cricketers
Tasmania cricketers
Cricketers from Greymouth